Krishna Rao is an Indian archaeologist and writer born in 1930.

He received his master's degree from Andhra University in 1953, and a postgraduate degree in archaeology in 1967 from the Archaeological Survey of India. For a time he was in charge of the Amaravathi Museum in Andhra Pradesh, India.

Published works

Indus Script Deciphered (1982) was published by Agam Kala Prakashan, Delhi, India.

In this book, Rao noted similarities between Sumerian pre-cuneiform writing, and Indus script, and proposed that Indus script encoded Sanskrit and a number of other languages. Rao theorized that Indus script consisted of ideograms and syllable signs, rather than being a pure syllabary like Brahmi script.

References

20th-century Indian archaeologists
Indian epigraphers
20th-century Indian linguists
Andhra University alumni
Living people
1930 births